Live in Dortmund is the second live album by German rock band Böhse Onkelz. It was recorded on 23 November 1996 at the Dortmund Westfalenhalle.

Track listing
Disc E.I.N.S.
 Intro
 Hier sind die Onkelz (Here are the Onkelz)
 Lieber stehend sterben (Rather die standing)
 Finde die Wahrheit (Find the truth)
 Danke für nichts (Thanks for nothing)
 Danket dem Herrn (Thank the Lord)
 Nichts ist für die Ewigkeit (Nothing lasts forever)
 Kneipenterroristen (Pub terrorists)
 Lasst es uns tun (Let's do it)
 Nichts ist so hart wie das Leben (Nothing is tougher than life)
 Heilige Lieder (Holy songs)
 Wieder mal 'nen Tag verschenkt (Another day wasted)
 Gehasst, verdammt, vergöttert (Hated, doomed and worshipped)
 Wer nichts wagt, kann nichts verlieren (Can't lose if you don't try)
 Nur die Besten sterben jung (Only the best ones die young)

Disc Z.W.E.I.
 Ach, Sie suchen Streit (Ah, you're looking for trouble)
 Ihr sollt den Tag nicht vor dem Abend loben (You shouldn't praise the day before it's over)
 So sind wir (That's how we are)
 Ich bin in dir (I'm in you)
 Könige für einen Tag (Kings for one day)
 Nekrophil (Necrophiliac)
 Scheißegal (Don't give a shit)
 Dick und durstig (Fat and thirsty)
 Oratorium/Wir ham' noch lange nicht genug (Oratorium/We're not done yet)
 Auf gute Freunde (To good friends)
 Mexico
 Erinnerung (Memory)

Böhse Onkelz live albums
1997 live albums
Virgin Records live albums